Vivaldo Borges dos Santos Neto (born 13 September 1996), commonly known as Neto Borges or simply Borges, is a Brazilian professional footballer who plays as a left-back for Ligue 1 club Clermont.

Career

Brazil
Neto Borges emerged into playing regular first team football in 2017, spending part of the year at Boca Júnior and Itabaiana. He later went to Clube Atlético Tubarão and featured as the club won their first Copa Santa Catarina title in late 2017.

Hammarby IF
Ahead of the 2018 season, Neto Borges transferred to Hammarby IF in Allsvenskan. He signed a three and a half-year deal with the Swedish club. He made his league debut for Hammarby on 1 April against Sirius in a 3–1 home win, playing the full 90 minutes. 

Borges went on to play 26 games for the club in Allsvenskan, providing four assists, as Hammarby finished 4th in the league. He was chosen one of the eleven best players of the 2018 season by Cmore Sports, Fotbollskanalen and Playmaker.

Genk
On 3 January 2019, Borges completed a transfer to Genk in the Belgian First Division A. He signed a three and a half-year contract with the club, with an option for a further. Hammarby confirmed that they received a club-record fee for Borges, reportedly set between €2 million and €3 million. On 5 August 2020, it was announced that Borges had agreed a contract to play with Brazilian Club CR Vasco da Gama until July 2021.

Clermont
On 13 June 2022, Borges signed a contract for two years with an option for the third year with Clermont in France.

Honours
Clube Atlético Tubarão
 Copa Santa Catarina: 2017

Genk
 Belgian First Division A: 2018–19

References

1996 births
Living people
Brazilian footballers
Association football defenders
Clube Atlético Tubarão players
Hammarby Fotboll players
K.R.C. Genk players
CR Vasco da Gama players
C.D. Tondela players
Clermont Foot players
Allsvenskan players
Belgian Pro League players
Campeonato Brasileiro Série A players
Primeira Liga players
Brazilian expatriate footballers
Expatriate footballers in Sweden
Brazilian expatriate sportspeople in Sweden
Expatriate footballers in Belgium
Brazilian expatriate sportspeople in Belgium
Expatriate footballers in Portugal
Brazilian expatriate sportspeople in Portugal
Expatriate footballers in France
Brazilian expatriate sportspeople in France